Rock and a Hard Place is a documentary film produced by and featuring Dwayne Johnson about youth prison boot camps in Miami, Florida, premiered by HBO in March 2017. Rock and a Hard Place, directed and co-produced by Oscar-nominated filmmakers Jon Alpert and Matthew O'Neill.
There is another documentary entitled "Jerusalem: A rock and Hard place".
This second films deals with life in the city of Jerusalem. They are not related.

References

External links 

 

2017 television films
2017 films
Documentary films about incarceration in the United States
HBO documentary films
2010s American films